Infinity at Brickell is a skyscraper in Miami, Florida, United States. It is located in Miami's Brickell Financial District. When it topped out, it was the 6th tallest building in Miami and Florida. Although not in the same complex, it was built across the street from Infinity II site, hence its name. The location is in southwestern Brickell, on South Miami Avenue near 13th Street. The building opened in 2008. It is about  shorter than Infinity II was supposed to be. The lower floors of the building are dedicated to office space and retail, while the upper floors are used for residential units. The architects are Adache Group Architects and Borges & Associates.

See also
List of tallest buildings in Miami
List of tallest buildings in Florida
 Downtown Miami

References

Gallery

Residential buildings completed in 2008
Residential skyscrapers in Miami
2008 establishments in Florida